Games played (most often abbreviated as G or GP) is a statistic used in team sports to indicate the total number of games in which a player has participated (in any capacity); the statistic is generally applied irrespective of whatever portion of the game is contested. In baseball, the statistic applies also to players who, before a game, are included on a starting lineup card or are announced as ex ante substitutes, whether or not they play; however, in Major League Baseball, the application of this statistic does not extend to consecutive games played streaks. A starting pitcher, then, may be credited with a game played even if he is not credited with a game started or an inning pitched. First base, or 1B, is the first of four stations on a baseball diamond which must be touched in succession by a baserunner to score a run for that player's team. A first baseman is the player on the team playing defense who fields the area nearest first base, and is responsible for the majority of plays made at that base. It is the only one of the four infield positions commonly played by left-handed players. In the numbering system used to record defensive plays, the first baseman is assigned the number 3.

Throughout major league history, there have been players who enjoyed long careers as first basemen; in the 19th century, Cap Anson was the first player ever to appear in 2,000 games at any single position. Through 2021, 21 players had appeared in over 2,000 games as first basemen, more than at any other position; at least one of the 21 has been active in every major league season, except the last two years of World War II. Eddie Murray is the all-time leader in career games as a first baseman, playing 2,413 games at the position.

Key

List

Stats updated as of the end of the 2022 season.

Other Hall of Famers

Notes

References

External links

Major League Baseball statistics
Games played as a first baseman